Modestas Paulauskas (19 March 1945) is a former Soviet and Lithuanian professional basketball coach and basketball player.

As a player, he was the youngest EuroBasket MVP in history, being only 20 years old at the time he won the award. He is known for having been one of the best Lithuanian basketball players of all time, and for having excellent dribbling ability. He was selected as the Lithuanian Sportsman of the Year, a record seven times, in 1965–1967, and 1969–1972. He was a member of the Soviet team that achieved Olympic Gold in 1972 in Munich.

In 1991, he was named one of FIBA's 50 Greatest Players.

In 2021, he was included into the FIBA Hall of Fame.

Playing career

Club career
Paulauskas spent his whole club career with Žalgiris Kaunas, despite getting attention from teams based in Western Europe and the National Basketball Association (NBA). He could not join them due to political reasons, as Lithuania was occupied by the Soviet Union at that time,  and people could not freely travel abroad. He was also asked to join Žalgiris Kaunas's main rival, CSKA Moscow, but he declined.

Soviet national team
Paulauskas was a part of the senior Soviet Union national basketball teams that won the bronze medal at the 1968 Summer Olympic Games, and the gold medal at the 1972 Summer Olympic Games. Paulauskas became the captain of the senior Soviet national team in 1969.

Coaching career
After retiring from playing basketball competitions, Paulauskas worked as a coach of the Soviet Union junior national teams from 1977 to 1989. In the early 1990s, he was the head coach of his native club, Žalgiris Kaunas. After that, he coached basketball in schools, both in Lithuania and in Russia.

Notes

References

Further reading
  INTERVIU: M.Paulauskas: "Noriu būti reikalingas" (FOTO). Eurobasket.lt.
  Modestas PAULAUSKAS. Kauno diena.

External links

FIBA Player Profile

1945 births
Living people
Basketball players at the 1968 Summer Olympics
Basketball players at the 1972 Summer Olympics
BC Rytas coaches
BC Žalgiris coaches
BC Žalgiris players
FIBA EuroBasket-winning players
FIBA World Championship-winning players
Lithuanian basketball coaches
Lithuanian men's basketball players
Lithuanian Sportsperson of the Year winners
Medalists at the 1968 Summer Olympics
Medalists at the 1972 Summer Olympics
Olympic basketball players of the Soviet Union
Olympic bronze medalists for the Soviet Union
Olympic gold medalists for the Soviet Union
Olympic medalists in basketball
Sportspeople from Kretinga
Small forwards
Soviet men's basketball players
1967 FIBA World Championship players
1970 FIBA World Championship players
1974 FIBA World Championship players
Lithuanian Sports University alumni
FIBA Hall of Fame inductees